Josiah Mills (25 October 1862 – 23 November 1929) was an English cricketer. He was a right-handed batsman and a wicket-keeper. He was born and died in Oldham, Lancashire.

Mills made one first-class appearance for Lancashire during the 1889 season. In the single inning in which he batted, he scored one run. He made one catch and one stumping.

References

1862 births
1929 deaths
English cricketers
Lancashire cricketers
People from Oldham